HMS Gurkha was a  destroyer that saw active service in the Norway Campaign in 1940, where she was sunk.

Description
The Tribals were intended to counter the large destroyers being built abroad and to improve the firepower of the existing destroyer flotillas and were thus significantly larger and more heavily armed than the preceding . The destroyers were powered by two Parsons geared steam turbines, each driving one propeller shaft using steam provided by three Admiralty three-drum boilers. The ships' complement consisted of 190 officers and ratings, although the flotilla leaders carried an extra 20 officers and men consisting of the Captain (D) and his staff.

The primary armament of the Tribal-class destroyers was eight quick-firing (QF) 4.7-inch (120 mm) Mark XII guns in four superfiring twin-gun mounts, one pair each fore and aft of the superstructure, designated 'A', 'B', 'X', and 'Y' from front to rear. The mounts had a maximum elevation of 40°. For anti-aircraft (AA) defence, they carried a single quadruple mount for the  QF two-pounder Mk II "pom-pom" gun and two quadruple mounts for the 0.5-inch (12.7 mm) Mark III machine gun. Low-angle fire for the main guns was controlled by the director-control tower (DCT) on the bridge roof that fed data acquired by it and the  rangefinder on the Mk II Rangefinder/Director directly aft of the DCT to an analogue mechanical computer, the Mk I Admiralty Fire Control Clock. Anti-aircraft fire for the main guns was controlled by the Rangefinder/Director which sent data to the mechanical Fuze Keeping Clock.

The ships were fitted with a single above-water quadruple mount for  torpedoes. The Tribals were not intended as anti-submarine ships, but they were provided with ASDIC, one depth charge rack and two throwers for self-defence, although the throwers were not mounted in all ships; Twenty depth charges was the peacetime allotment, but this increased to 30 during wartime.

Construction and career 
Authorized as one of seven Tribal-class destroyers under the 1935 Naval Estimates, Gurkha (originally Ghurka) was the second ship of her name to serve in the Royal Navy. The ship was ordered on 10 March 1936 from Fairfield Shipbuilding and Engineering and was laid down on 6 July at the company's Govan shipyard. Launched on 7 July 1937, Gurkha was commissioned on 21 October at a cost of £340,997 which excluded weapons and communications outfits furnished by the Admiralty. The ship's completion was delayed by the late delivery of her gunsights.

On commissioning, Gurkha joined the First Tribal Destroyer Flotilla (which was renamed the 4th Destroyer Flotilla in April 1939) as part of the Mediterranean Fleet. She was involved in exercises and port visits until the outbreak of war, suffering minor damage in a collision with sister-ship . In September 1939, Gurkha was one of a group of ships assigned to monitor Italian naval activity in the Red Sea. In October 1939 the flotilla was reassigned to the Home Fleet, on escort duty from Portland. Gurkha, like many of the Tribals, suffered from mechanical defects including problems with the ship's turbines and leaks in the reserve feed tanks, and underwent repair at Thornycroft's Southampton shipyard from December 1939 to January 1940, before rejoining her Flotilla, now based at Scapa Flow.

On the night of 23/24 February 1940, Gurkha spotted the German submarine  on the surface between the Faroe Islands and Orkney Islands. She attacked and sank the enemy south of the Faroe Islands on 23 February 1940. U-53 dived to avoid a ramming attempt by Gurkha. Gurkha responded with a series of depth charge attacks, sinking U-53 with the loss of all hands.

The attack was cancelled by the British Admiralty, however, and the British force was attacked by 47 German Ju 88 and 41 He 111 bombers of Kampfgeschwader 30 and Kampfgeschwader 26. In an attempt to obtain better firing conditions, Gurkha moved away from the mutual protection of the naval force. She then became an easy target for concentrated air attack and soon was stopped by a single bomb hit. The crew were rescued by the cruiser Aurora and the destroyer Mashona, with Gurkha sinking with the loss of 16 of her crew.

Notes

References
 
 
 
 
 
 
 

 
 
 
 
 

 

Tribal-class destroyers (1936) of the Royal Navy
Ships built in Govan
1937 ships
World War II destroyers of the United Kingdom
World War II shipwrecks in the Norwegian Sea
Maritime incidents in April 1940
Destroyers sunk by aircraft
Ships sunk by German aircraft